The Truth Hurts 1985-2000 is a compilation album by Dessau, released on July 28, 2009, by Mausoleum. The album packages tracks from band's first two EPs, four previously unreleased songs produced by Paul Barker, alternate mixes and two live covers of Joy Division and New Order.

Reception
Connexion Bizarre criticized The Truth Hurts 1985-2000 for being a poorly assembled collection and said "it's perfectly passable industrial of a kind that is all but history now, but the thing is, others did it better." Fabryka Music Magazine awarded the collection a perfect rating of four out of four stars.

Track listing

Personnel
Adapted from the liner notes of The Truth Hurts 1985-2000.

Dessau
 John Elliott – vocals (1-3, 5–17), programming (1-10, 12–14), percussion (14, 15), drums (11), piano (15), keyboards (17), production (1, 2, 10, 16, 17), mixing (1, 2, 9, 12)

Additional performers
 Steve Anderson – guitar (5, 7)
 Paul Barker – production (5-8), recording (5-8), mixing (5-8), bass guitar (3, 5, 7, 8), programming (5), guitar (8)
 Robert Benjamin – guitar (1, 2)
 Patrick Benson – drums (15, 17)
 Frank Brodlo – bass guitar (11)
 Clay Brocker – vocals (7)
 Van Christie – production, recording, mixing and programming (3, 4)
 Dave D'eath – bass guitar (1, 2, 16), arrangements (1, 2)
 Kim Ervin Elliott – vocals (14, 15)
 Mike Griffith – saxophone (9), recording (10)
 Lynn Green – percussion (3)
 Tom Gregory – percussion, production, recording and mixing (13)
 Kevin Hamilton – guitar (14)
 James Horn – bass guitar (14)
 Jim Marcus – programming (4)
 Jason McNinch – production, recording, mixing and programming (3, 4)
 Barry Nelson – bass guitar (6, 9, 10)
 Skot Nelson – guitar (11, 13, 15, 17)
 Richard Patrick – guitar (9)
 Mike Orr – guitar (6, 9, 10) vocals (9, 10), bass guitar (13, 15, 17)
 Andy Schmidt – guitar (12)
 Norm Rau – guitar (3, 16), vocals (3)
 Terry Townson – horn (7)
 Jason Williams – keyboards (1, 2)

Production and design
 Art of the Groove – art direction, design
 Tom Der – recording (11, 14, 15), piano (11)
 Robb Earls – recording (5-9, 12), mixing (7, 8, 12), production (9, 12)
 Martin Hannett – production and mixing (14, 15)
 Tom Harding – production, recording and mixing (13)
 Mark McCleerey – recording, mixing and programming (1, 2)
 John Trevethan – mastering, editing, programming (5)
 Rick Will – mixing (10)

Release history

References

External links 
 The Truth Hurts 1985-2000 at Discogs (list of releases)
 The Truth Hurts 1985-2000 at Bandcamp
 The Truth Hurts 1985-2000 at iTunes

2009 compilation albums
Dessau (band) albums
Albums produced by Paul Barker
Albums produced by Martin Hannett
Albums produced by Giles Reaves
WTII Records compilation albums